Trump International Golf Links & Hotel Ireland, formerly Doonbeg Golf Club, is a traditional links-type course situated to the north of Doonbeg in County Clare, Ireland. Designed by Greg Norman and opened in 2002, the geography was hardly changed as the course was fitted into the area provided. The complex hosts a 5-star hotel, spa, cottages and reception rooms.

History
Clare footballer David Tubridy spent time at Doonbeg Golf Club when he was a boy (caddying for such visitors as Hugh Grant and Gary Player). When Tubridy became top scorer in National Football League history against Cork in May 2021, his total score in the competition after this game (22–412, i.e. 478 points) causing him to overtake Mickey Kearins, the then Trump-owned establishment celebrated by giving him lifetime membership of its golf club.

In February 2014, the lodge and golf club was bought by American businessman Donald Trump for an estimated €15M. The Lodge at Doonbeg consists of 218 hotel suites, a spa and several restaurants managed by the Trump Hotel Collection. Then Irish Minister for Finance, Michael Noonan, was criticised for participating in a red-carpet welcoming party for Donald Trump when the latter visited Ireland after completing the purchase.

In 2016 as a US presidential candidate, Trump claimed at a campaign rally that he bought it during an economic downturn in Ireland, that it was a good investment, but that he didn't care about it anymore and described his investment as 'small potatoes'.

Permits for construction 
The business applied for permits to construct a  sea wall to protect the property, citing "global warming and its effects", although Trump himself denies the existence of global warming. The plan attracted strong opposition from environmentalists due to concerns that it would adversely affect the Special Area of Conservation status of the site, and was withdrawn in December 2016. In December 2017, permission was granted by Clare County Council for two smaller barriers, however this permission was rescinded in early 2020, following an appeal to An Bord Pleanála.

, a decision on permission for "53 short term let cottages, ballroom and leisure building" was pending subject to a request for "further information" by Clare County Council.

Management
On assuming the office of United States president in January 2017, Trump (along with his daughter Ivanka) resigned as director of the golf complex; his sons Eric and Donald Jr. remained. For 2019, the company had reported a pre-tax loss of 1.37 million euros. In November 2021, the resort reported revenue of 3.8 million euros in 2020 and an operating loss of almost 2 million euros ($2.3 million), a pre-tax loss of 3.59 million euros. Its workforce was reduced from 230 to 112, and the company received 459,000 euros in government grants for COVID relief.

See also
 Donald Trump and golf

References

External links
Official Site

2002 establishments in Ireland
Donald Trump real estate
Golf clubs and courses in the Republic of Ireland
Golf in Munster
Sports venues completed in 2002
Sports venues in County Clare
21st-century architecture in the Republic of Ireland